A mycoherbicide is a herbicide based on a fungus.  As a biological agent, these "mycoherbicides... work by producing toxic compounds that dissolve the cell walls of targeted plants". Unlike traditional herbicides, mycoherbicides can reproduce themselves and linger in the soil for many years to destroy replanted crops.

Commercial weed control products 
These include:
 Alter naria destruens, to control dodder
 Chondrostereum purpureum, to control Prunus & Populus spp. in parts of Europe and Canada
 Colletotrichum acutatum, to control Silky hakea
 Colletotrichum gloeosporioides f. sp. aeschynomene: isolated from Northern joint vetch (Aeschynomene virginica) for rice & soybeans
 Cylindrobasidium laeve to control Acacia mearnsii (black wattle) in S. Africa
 Phytophthora palmivora: isolated from strangler vine (Morrenia odorata)
 Puccinia canaliculate, to control Yellow nutsedge
 Puccinia thalaspeos, to control Dyer's woad
 Sclerotinia minor, to control Dandelion

Drug plants
In the United States House of Representatives, the Office of National Drug Control Policy Reauthorization Act of 2006 (H.R. 2829) passed with the inclusion of language to initiate research into the use of mycoherbicides against drug crops in foreign countries. In particular, the U.S. is considering using Fusarium oxysporum as a mycoherbicide against coca plants in Colombia. The United States Senate is currently drafting its own version of the bill.

See also

 Bioherbicide
 Plan Colombia

References

External links
Fact Sheet on Mycoherbicide Cooperation- Center for International Policy
Wired article about mycoherbicide use against coca plants
Drug Control or Biowarfare? About mycoherbicide use against coca plants in Colombia

Herbicides

Fungus ecology
Fungi and humans